This page details the other fictional characters created by Agatha Christie in her stories about the Belgian detective, Hercule Poirot.

Captain Arthur Hastings

Hastings first meets Poirot during his years as a private detective in Europe. Almost immediately after they both arrive in England, he becomes Poirot's partner, and appears in many of the novels and stories. Poirot's view of Hastings was of a man with plenty of imagination but not a great deal of brains.

Hastings was capable of great bravery when the going got tough, facing death unflinchingly when confronted by the "Big Four" and showing unwavering loyalty towards Poirot. When forced to choose between Poirot and his wife in that novel, he chose Poirot.

The two were an airtight team until Hastings met and married Dulcie Duveen, a beautiful music hall performer he met in The Murder on the Links. They later emigrated to Argentina, leaving Poirot behind a "very unhappy old man".

Ariadne Oliver

A mystery writer who is loosely based on Agatha Christie herself.

Miss Felicity Lemon
Poirot's secretary, Miss Lemon, has few human weaknesses. The only two mistakes she is ever recorded making are a typing error in Hickory Dickory Dock (due to her sister's predicament) and the mismailing of an electric bill. Poirot describes her as "Unbelievably ugly and incredibly efficient. Anything that she mentioned as worth consideration usually was worth consideration." She is an expert on nearly everything, and plans to create the perfect filing system. She once worked for the government agent-turned-amateur detective and philanthropist, Mr (James) Parker Pyne. Whether this was during one of Poirot's numerous retirements or before she entered his employ is unknown.

Inspector Japp

Inspector James Japp is an Inspector at Scotland Yard and appears in many of the stories, trying to solve the cases Poirot is working on. Japp is an outward-looking, loud and sometimes inconsiderate man, and his relationship with the bourgeois Belgian is one of the stranger aspects of Poirot's world. He first met Poirot in Belgium in 1904 during the Abercrombie Forgery, and later that year joined forces again to hunt down a criminal known as Baron Altara. They also meet in England, where Poirot often helps Japp solve cases and lets him take the credit in return for special favours. These favours usually entail being supplied with cases that would interest him.

George
George (or "Georges", as Poirot often calls him) is the faithful valet of Hercule Poirot.

In addition to these regular characters, all the gentlemen in the novels have servants; Poirot's is the most incurable snob he could find. George is a classic English valet. He first entered Poirot's employ in 1923, and did not leave his side until the 1970s, shortly before Poirot's death. A competent, matter-of-fact man, with an extensive knowledge of the English aristocracy and absolutely no imagination, George provides a steady contrast to Hastings.

Colonel Race
Race is a highly intelligent ex-Army colonel who had a stint as a leader of the counter-intelligence division of the British spy agency MI5. He is immensely rich, having inherited the fortune of Sir Laurence Eardsley. The Colonel stars as a detective in four of Christie's books; he is introduced in The Man in the Brown Suit, published in 1924. He features as Hercule Poirot's good friend in Cards on the Table (1936) and Death on the Nile (1937). He appears for the last time in Sparkling Cyanide (1945), and as with his first appearance, Poirot is not a character in the novel. He is known for his patience, composure, and ability to detect facts quickly without anyone else noticing. Although rather conventional in his deductive thought processes, he has an exceptionally open mind regarding possibilities and theories, and while he is amazed by some of the deductions Poirot makes, he never doubts nor discounts them (as, for instance, Japp initially might), no matter how fantastical. The Man in the Brown Suit is perhaps the only novel in which the emotional side of Colonel Race's nature has been given consideration. It gives depth to his personality.

In the 1978 film of Death on the Nile Colonel Race is played by David Niven. In the same book's 2004 TV adaptation for the television series Agatha Christie's Poirot, he is played by James Fox. As Fox was unavailable for the 2006 adaptation of Cards on the Table the character was replaced by the similar character "Colonel Hughes", played by Robert Pugh. ITV's adaptation of The Clocks makes the character of Colin Lamb, strongly implied in the book to be the son of Superintendent Battle, into the offspring of Colonel Race. He is also mentioned in the adaptation of Third Girl. In the BBC Radio 4 adaptations of Death on the Nile (1997) and Cards on the Table (2002), Race is played by Donald Sinden. 

His first name is given as "Johnnie" by a minor character in Sparkling Cyanide. In the film of Death on the Nile, he is called "Johnny". The 2002 ITV adaptation of Sparkling Cyanide featured Oliver Ford Davies as "Colonel Geoffrey Reece".

Countess Vera Rossakoff
Countess Vera Rossakoff is the only woman with whom Hercule Poirot has ever admitted being attracted. The countess' true name is a mystery. She appears in only one novel, The Big Four, and two short stories, "The Double Clue" and "The Capture of Cerberus" (The Labours of Hercules series).

References

 
Lists of literary characters